Yusuf Rıza Pasha (1826 – 1894) was an Ottoman politician during the late Tanzimat period.

References 

1826 births
1894 deaths
Political people from the Ottoman Empire
People from Bitola